Syntaxin-16 is a protein that in humans is encoded by the STX16 gene.

It has been associated with pseudohypoparathyroidism type Ib. Losing this gene causes loss of methylation at GNAS1 exon A/B.

Interactions 

STX16 has been shown to interact with VAMP4.

References

Further reading